Lake Huntsman is an artificial lake created in 2007 in Tasmania, Australia, with the construction of the Meander Dam, which backed up the waters of the Upper Meander River and the various creeks and rivulets that flowed into it from the Great Western Tiers meltwater. Lake Huntsman provides irrigation water to the Meander region and generates electricity for the Huntsman Lake Power Station.

The lake has become a popular tourist and fishing spot.

References

Huntsman
Huntsman
Northern Tasmania